Xenochroa chlorostigma is a moth of the family Nolidae first described by George Hampson in 1893. It is found in India, Sri Lanka, Himalaya, Sundaland, Philippines and Sulawesi.

Description
The female is larger than the male. Its forewings have a slightly falcate (sickle shaped) apex. Its reniform spot is conspicuous and dark green. Stigmata orbicular. A dark green patch found just posterior to the orbicular. The caterpillar has a distinct berry-shaped tumidity on its thoracic region. Only primary setae present. Bifid prominence and anal claspers dull black. Head green with orange body segments. Dorsal band olive-greenish brown with a dark dorsal line. A double white line runs laterally which is same as dorsal color, whitish or orange. Spiracular band orange with purple suffusion. Pupation occurs in a silken cocoon. Pupa lacks a cremaster. Cocoon buffy yellow with burnt patchy appearance.

Larval host plants are Eugenia, Memecylon edule and Syzygium.

References

Moths of Asia
Moths described in 1893
Nolidae